Deep South is a 1937 American short film directed by Leslie Goodwins. It was nominated for an Academy Award at the 10th Academy Awards in 1937 for Best Short Subject (Two-Reel).

Cast
 Willie Best 
 Daisy Bufford
 Clarence Muse

References

External links

1937 films
1937 short films
American black-and-white films
RKO Pictures short films
Films directed by Leslie Goodwins
1930s English-language films